Happy Children is the fifth studio album by Ghanaian Afro rock band Osibisa released in 1973 by Warner Bros. Records WB 2732. Released on CD format 2000 by One Way Records 35164 and COE Records COE 111.

Track listing

Track listing CD COE Records

 "Happy Children"
 "Fire"
 "Adwoa"
 "Take Your Trouble... Go"
 "Bassa-Bassa"
 "Somaja"
 "Kotoku"
 "We Want to Know"

Charts

Personnel
Teddy Osei – tenor saxophone, flute, percussion, vocals
Sol Amarfio – bongos, drums
Mac Tontoh – trumpet, flugelhorn
Kofi Ayivor - congas, percussion
Jean-Karl Dikoto Mandengue - bass
Jean-Alain Roussel - keyboards

Production
 Producer – Peter Gallen
 Engineer – Ashley Howe
 Cover illustration - Jeff Schrier
 Art direction - Ed Thrasher
 Photography – Fin Costello

References

 All information gathered from liner notes of CD Happy Children (Copyright © 1973 Warner Bros. Records WB 2732).
 Allmusic 
 Discogs 

1973 albums
Osibisa albums
Warner Records albums